Pinctada radiata, commonly known as the Atlantic pearl-oyster or the Gulf pearl oyster is a species of pearl oyster distributed throughout the Indo-Pacific and in the Mediterranean. Its range extends as far north as Japan and as far south as the Australian state of Victoria.

Description
The shell is, thin, compressed, and square-like, with growth rings and ribs on the top surface. Its coloration varies, though it usually displays a brown or red exterior with a pearly interior and a light brown edge. More rarely, the shell may display a green or bronze exterior. Darker brown or red rays may mark the shell, creating darker areas at the margin. The shell's shape and structure also show much variation, hence its many synonyms; it has been described as "very similar to Pinctada margaritifera", and has been misidentified on occasion as P. margaritifera. P. radiata is hermaphroditic, with reproductive maturity being influenced by temperature.

Distribution
It attaches itself to various hard substrata, including rocks and wrecks. P. radiata is common throughout its range, possibly because of its adaptation to subtropical environments and ability to survive in polluted water. It was originally distributed only in the Indo-Pacific, but has been introduced into the Mediterranean unintentionally through the Suez Canal and intentionally for aquaculture.

Human uses
Pinctada radiata is harvested for pearls, especially in Qatari waters, where it may constitute up to 95% of the oyster catch. It is also caught for its edible flesh and lustrous shell. P. radiata has also been investigated for possible use as a bioindicator of heavy metals in Persian Gulf waters.

References

Pteriidae
Bivalves of Australia
Molluscs of Japan
Molluscs of the Mediterranean Sea
Molluscs of the Pacific Ocean
Pearls
Bivalves described in 1814